The Costa Rican elections of 1859 allowed the re-election for the third time of Juan Rafael Mora Porras, hero of the Filibuster War. However, Mora would not finish his term because he would be overthrown by his political opponents on August 14 of that same year.

The 1859 Constitution in force at that time only allowed men over 25 years old and owners of a property valued at least 200 pesos to cast the vote.

References

Elections in Costa Rica
1859 elections in Central America
Single-candidate elections
1859 in Costa Rica